Sven Hassel was the pen name of the Danish-born Børge Willy Redsted Pedersen (19 April 1917 – 21 September 2012) known for his novels about Herman soldiers fighting in World War II.
In Denmark he used the pen name Sven Hazel. He is one of the bestselling Danish authors, possibly second only to Hans Christian Andersen.

Military service
Hassel claimed that at the age of 14 he joined the merchant navy as a cabin boy and worked on ships until his military service in 1936. He said that he then joined the German army and served in tank units during World War II.

Contrary to these claims is a belief that Hassel was actually Børge Willy Redsted Pedersen. On 23 August 1942 the resistance newspaper De Frie Danske reported that on 13 August a Cadillac registered to DNSAP leader Frits Clausen had crashed in Copenhagen. A "Børge Petersen" involved in the crash first disappeared but was later apprehended and awaited trial. DNSAP subsequently issued a statement that due to his prior convictions Børge Petersen was not and could never be a member of DNSAP. De Frie Danske opined that if this statement were true there would hardly be any members at all in DNSAP. The author Erik Haaest claimed that the criminal record of Børge Willy Redsted Pedersen shows that he was the aforementioned "Børge Petersen" and that he in connection with the car crash impersonated a police officer and that he was living at Høffdingsvej 21 with his parents. Haaest's implication is that Pedersen's claim that he was a naturalized German citizen fighting with the German armed forces is contradicted by his arrest in Copenhagen as a civilian with several prior convictions.

Whilst Hassel  claimed to have surrendered to Soviet troops in Berlin in 1945 and to have spent the following years in prisoner-of-war camps in various countries, independent sources state that he was arrested in Denmark in 1945 after the liberation and was held in prison there, first as a suspect and then as a convicted criminal.

Hassel was released from prison in 1949 after having served four years out of his ten-year prison sentence.

Post-war years
After his release, Hassel was planning to join the French Foreign Legion when he met his future wife. He and Laura Dorthea Guldbæk Jensen, a divorced film translator from Nørre Tranders who was four years his senior, married in Copenhagen in January 1951.

In 1953 his debut novel Legion of the Damned was published under the pen name Sven Hazel by Grafisk Forlag after their consultant Georgjedde (Georg Gjedde-Simonsen) had abbreviated and rewritten the manuscript.

In 1964, he moved to Barcelona, Spain, where he lived until his death.

Works
Hassel's books are written in the first person, with Hassel himself as a character, though not necessarily the lead character. The books describe the exploits of a 27th (Penal) Panzer Regiment composed of expendable soldiers – sentenced criminals, court-martialed soldiers and political undesirables. In addition to Sven, they include Alfred Kalb, "Legionnaire" (ex-member of the French Foreign Legion); Wolfgang Creutzfeldt, a giant of a man ironically named Tiny (variously Little John in some of the books); barracks fixer and shrewd thief Joseph Porta; older sergeant Willie Beier, "Old Un" or "Old Man"; Julius Heide, a Nazi fanatic, Barcelona Blom, a veteran of both sides of the Spanish Civil War, Gregor Martin, who was a removals man before the war, Chief Mechanic Wolf, and Staff Sergeant Hoffman, a non-commissioned officer. They serve on many fronts, including northern Finland, USSR, Italy (Monte Cassino), Greece (The Bloody Road to Death), the Balkans, and France (Liquidate Paris, set during and after the Normandy Invasion). The majority of the action occurs in the USSR. Due to errors in chronology, the regiment fights in several places, hundreds of kilometres apart, at the same time. In some of the books the 27th Regiment does guard duty for the Gestapo in Hamburg (Assignment Gestapo) and also at the military prison at Torgau (March Battalion). Hassel stated that whilst his novels are essentially works of fiction, the characters are based on real people and some events are related to historical events.

Hassel's view of war is brutal. In his books, soldiers fight only to survive, with the Geneva Convention rarely being observed on the Eastern front. People are killed by chance or with very little reason. Occasional pleasant events and peaceful meetings are brutally cut short. Unsympathetic Prussian officers constantly threaten their men with courts-martial and execute them with little provocation. Disgruntled soldiers occasionally kill their own officers to get rid of them. By graphically portraying war as violent and hopeless in such manner, Hassel's books have been said to contain an anti-war message.

In total he published 14 novels which have been translated into 18 languages. In 1987 his book Wheels of Terror was made into a film of the same title and also known as The Misfit Brigade.

Hassel's books are particularly popular in the United Kingdom, where he sold 15 million of the 53 million sold worldwide. In contrast his books are not deemed suitable for the public libraries in his home country Denmark where a 2011 opinion piece on literature in Dagbladet Information described Hassel as a traitor and his debut novel as the worst book ever with its characters plagiarized from All Quiet on the Western Front.

Controversy
On 10 October 1963 journalist George Kringelbach revealed in his radio programme Natredaktionen on P3 that Sven Hazel was a pen name for the convicted traitor Børge Willy Redsted Pedersen. Further, Kringelbach claimed that while Pedersen might have been in Germany during the war, it was not in a penal battalion. Rather, during the war he had been working for a German intelligence agency which collaborated with HIPO. Hassel's publisher Grafisk Forlag subsequently offered all book dealers a refund for his most recent book and ceased collaboration with him. Pedersen therefore formed his own publishing company , which published the remainder of his books.

The controversial Danish writer Erik Haaest disputed Hassel's claims for many years. According to Haaest, the author never served on the Eastern front but spent the majority of World War II in occupied Denmark and his knowledge of warfare comes second-hand from Danish Waffen-SS veterans whom he met after the end of the war. Haaest claims that during the war period, Hassel was in fact a member of the HIPO Corps or Hilfspolizei, an auxiliary Danish police force created by the Gestapo, consisting of collaborators. Haaest also alleges that Hassel's first novel was ghostwritten and that, when it became a success, he employed his wife to write the rest of his books.

In 1976 Hassel threatened Haaest with a lawsuit for defamation in reaction to Haasts' publication of the book . A review of Haaest's book quotes Hassel's own statements and writes that his sentence of 10 years prison for treason was given primarily because he was an informant for the German occupation force in Denmark and argues that he could not both have been an informant in Copenhagen and been fighting deep inside Soviet territory.

In 2010 the Danish public service television channel DR2 dedicated one of its five episodes on scandals in Denmark to Hassel. The program explained that he at first was wildly popular among his Danish readers and celebrated as a Danish Ernest Hemingway, until in 1963 he was exposed as a fraud with a dubious wartime past. He became an outcast and had go into exile to continue publishing. The national Danish Radio which aired the exposure were subsequently forced to issue a retraction after Hassel provided corroborating documentation of his wartime service.  With more than 50 million books sold, he is the most sold Danish author ever but never received recognition or forgiveness.

In March 2010, Berlingske Tidende gave a detailed account of Hassel's exposure as a fraud and his post-war prison sentence. In 1963 the radio journalist George Kringelbach had participated in a reception Hassel gave to celebrate his ten years as a vastly successful writer. The reception saw participation by numerous dignitaries including ambassadors and envoys of six foreign countries. Until then the public was under the impression that Hassel was a real person and that his books were autobiographical. When during his late night radio programme Kringelbach subsequently revealed that Sven Hassel was a fictitious person and that the author was a convicted traitor, a major scandal ensued. The national radio of Denmark and Hassel reached a settlement, which at the time was seen as a retraction by the national radio. The settlement enraged Kringelbach's colleagues and Kringelbach subsequently left his employer. According to Berlingske, the settlement actually acknowledges that Hassel was affiliated with the German intelligence agency E.T., the intelligence-gathering branch of HIPO. Based on the settlement, Berlingske went on to detail the 1947 sentence of Hassel. The sentence does indeed state that Hassel served in an armoured regiment of the German Wehrmacht. However, the newspaper goes on to explain that the author Haaest in 1976 had interviewed Hassel's defence attorney, member of parliament and mayor of Copenhagen Edel Saunte. According to Haaest, Saunte had explained that in court Hassel had insisted that the charges against him should be extended with a clause that he had also served as a German soldier, although he had obviously never done that. After insisting several times, the judge ended the discussions with a statement to the effect that she could no longer bear his insistence on this nonsensical front line service, but that he would also be convicted for that, although it would not add to or detract from his prison sentence. Berlingske account ends with a statement from Haaest, that what actually happened is still a matter of belief, as well as a statement from Hassel's son who refers to the official retraction from the national radio and said that his aging father had nothing more to add.

In 2012 the Danish World War II historian Claus Bundgård Christensen was quoted for his assertion that Hassel never served on the Eastern front and that his books are a fraud and not based on his personal experiences. The historian went on to speculate that Hassel got his information from his contacts in the German intelligence service.

During the last five years of his life  Hassel acknowledged the controversy in his home country over his authorship with a statement in Danish that In Denmark Sven Hassel has been put down (I Danmark er Sven Hazel blevet rakket ned), which he compares to the worldwide sale of his books in 53 million copies.

Death
On 21 September 2012 Hassel died, aged 95, in Barcelona. He was survived by his son.

Bibliography
English titles:
The Legion of the Damned (1953)
Wheels of Terror 
Comrades of War 
March Battalion
Assignment Gestapo 
Monte Cassino (The Beast Regiment)
Liquidate Paris
SS-General
Reign of Hell 
Blitzfreeze
The Bloody Road to Death
Court Martial
O.G.P.U. Prison
The Commissar

References

External links

Paul, Vitello, "Sven Hassel, Novelist Who Depicted Nazi Soldiers' Lives, Dies at 95," New York Times, October 6, 2012.

1917 births
2012 deaths
Danish emigrants to Germany
German emigrants to Spain
Danish male novelists
Danish sailors
German Army officers of World War II
Military humor
Naturalized citizens of Germany
20th-century Danish novelists
20th-century Danish male writers
Danish Waffen-SS personnel